Paula Fletcher (born 1951) is a Canadian politician who has served on Toronto City Council since 2003. She currently represents Ward 14 Toronto—Danforth.

Fletcher is regarded as an advocate for affordable housing, environmentally sustainable policy, social justice and good land use planning. She describes her views as ascribing to progressive values.

Early life and family
Fletcher was born in Sault Ste. Marie, Ontario and moved to Toronto, then to Winnipeg, Manitoba, before again relocating to Toronto.

She now lives in Toronto with her husband John Cartwright and their two children. Her husband is the president of the Toronto and York Region Labour Council. A carpenter by trade, Cartwright was formerly the Business Manager of the Construction Trades Council and co-chair of the Metro Jobstart Coalition. He has served on the Boards of the Waterfront Regeneration Trust, the United Way Toronto, the Toronto 2008 Olympic Bid, and the Labour Education Centre.

Early career
In Winnipeg, Fletcher worked as an educator in third world development, and became a community activist. She was a union organizer in a Toronto garment mill in the early 1970s. After working at the mill, she worked at the Downsview DeHavilland Plant. When she worked there, she went by the nickname "Rosie the Riveter". At the DeHavilland plant, she was involved in the women's committee of Canadian Auto Workers Local 112. In the 1990s, Fletcher worked at Toronto City Hall as executive assistant to city councillor Dan Leckie.

Politics 
In 1980, she ran for the Winnipeg School Board for Ward 2, in the city's north end. In 1981, she was elected leader of the Communist Party of Canada (Manitoba) and served as leader for five years. She ran in the 1981 and 1986 provincial elections in the Winnipeg riding of Burrows. She garnered 144 and 131 votes respectively, less than 2 per cent of the popular vote. In the early 1980s, she sang with a group called Rank and File. In 1986, Fletcher left the Communist Party and moved back to Toronto.

Toronto District School Board Trustee 
In 2000, Fletcher was elected as a trustee for Ward 15 in the Toronto District School Board (TDSB). During her time on the board, she was active in fighting service cuts by the Mike Harris and Ernie Eves Progressive Conservative governments, and helped prevent two school closures in her area. One of them was Bruce Junior Public School, which Fletcher helped save by housing a new centre there for childhood learning and development for families.

Toronto City Councillor

Election and early tenure 
When Jack Layton resigned from council to run for the leadership of the New Democratic Party (NDP), Fletcher ran to replace him and received the endorsement of Layton (who was NDP leader by the time of the Toronto council election campaign) and the NDP, and Marilyn Churley, who was the NDP member of Provincial Parliament (MPP).

In the 2003 municipal election, eight candidates competed in Ward 30. Prominent candidates included Chris Phibbs, who was executive assistant to Toronto City Councillor Kyle Rae for 11 years, and Maureen Gilroy, a centrist candidate who had the backing of Liberal member of Parliament (MP) Dennis Mills. A key issue in the 2003 election was the proposed fixed link to the Toronto Island Airport that Fletcher opposed. Fletcher won with 39.5 per cent of the vote.

As a councillor, Fletcher rallied Toronto City Council to oppose the Portlands Energy Centre, a 550 megawatt power plant in the Port Lands district beside the Hearn Generating Station. The grassroots campaign was unable to stop construction of the plant, which was completed in 2007. Significant developments in Ward 30 that Fletcher supported include Filmport (now known as Pinewood Toronto Studios), which is Canada's largest purpose-built sound stage and film production space, and the Zhong Hua Men Archway, the only traditional Chinese archway to be built in Toronto.

Re-election 
In the 2006 municipal election, Fletcher ran in a field of six candidates. Fletcher won with 60.3 per cent of the vote.

During Fletcher's second term, Fletcher served as the chair of the Parks and Environment Committee, where she spearheaded the City of Toronto's Climate Change, Clean Air and Sustainable Energy Action Plan and Climate Change Adaptation Strategy, and the People, Dogs and Parks – Off-Leash Areas and Commercial Dog Walker Permit Policy. She was also a member of the Mayor David Miller Executive Committee. She also served on the boards of Toronto Public Health and the Toronto Community Housing Corporation, and she chaired the Aboriginal Committee and the Animal Services sub-committee.

Leslieville Smart Centres development 
In 2009, Fletcher campaigned against an application by SmartCentres to build a  retail facility in the City's 'Studio District'. The development was proposed for lands occupied by Toronto Film Studios, which would have required a change in the zoning from industrial to retail. The proposal was denied on the grounds that the development would have destabilized the surrounding employment district. Smart Centres appealed the decision to the Ontario Municipal Board (OMB). In March 2009, the OMB sided with city council. However, OMB vice-chair James McKenzie was critical of measures taken to block the proposal.

Budget 2010 outburst 
On 2 March 2010, Fletcher "interrogated" a man who was identified as John Smith during deputations on the City of Toronto's budget. In response to Smith's criticisms, Fletcher wanted to know if he expected her to cut the arts budget, school breakfast programs, or subsidized daycare spots. Smith replied, "Councillor, you're asking me to do your job. Are you seeking re-election in [October]? You're being paid to make tough decisions." After a further exchange, he added, "You should be fired." Fletcher yelled back, "Oh, come and run against me. Come on down, baby!" Fletcher subsequently apologized for her comments, writing in a letter to Toronto City Council.

Bike lanes 
Fletcher has been a strong advocate for better bike lane infrastructure in Toronto and supports bicycle lanes on Danforth Avenue. In 2014, she joined a number of other councillors on "Bike to Work Day". In May 2010, however, Fletcher accidentally voted against a proposal to install bike lanes on University Avenue in downtown Toronto. The proposal failed on a 15-13 vote. She said she had intended to vote in favour of the proposal and cited fatigue and city hall technology for her mis-vote.

Third term
In the 2010 municipal election, Fletcher increased her vote to narrowly beat former CityTV reporter Liz West by less than 2 per cent of the votes cast. West's campaign was buoyed by the support of mayoral candidate Rob Ford and his upsurge in the campaign that led to his election. The Globe and Mail reported that there was a strong desire for change in the ward that led to the close showing by West, who entered the race in mid-August. Third-place candidate Andrew James dropped out of the race and endorsed West prior to the election day. The Toronto and York Region Labour Council endorsed Fletcher and several other councillor and school trustee candidates.

Fourth term 
Fletcher was re-elected in the 2014 municipal election, once again beating West and four other candidates.

Fifth term 
Fletcher was re-elected in the 2018 municipal election, running in the newly created Ward 14, which includes much of her old ward. She ran against fellow councillor Mary Fragdakis.

Electoral history

References

External links

1951 births
Women municipal councillors in Canada
Living people
People from Sault Ste. Marie, Ontario
Toronto District School Board trustees
Toronto city councillors
Women in Ontario politics
Canadian communists
Communist Party of Canada (Manitoba) politicians
20th-century Canadian politicians
20th-century Canadian women politicians
21st-century Canadian politicians
21st-century Canadian women politicians